Arno Claeys (born 5 April 1994) is a Belgian footballer who plays for Zwevezele.

Club career 

Claeys is a youth exponent from Kortrijk. He made his Belgian Pro League debut at 12 April 2014 against K.V. Mechelen in a 4–1 home win.

External links

References

1994 births
Living people
Belgian footballers
K.V. Kortrijk players
S.C. Eendracht Aalst players
Belgian Pro League players
Place of birth missing (living people)
Association football midfielders
Royal FC Mandel United players